Kirby Hendee (March 12, 1923 – March 11, 2016) was an American lawyer and politician.

Biography
Hendee was born in Milwaukee, Wisconsin. He graduated from Shorewood High School in Shorewood, Wisconsin and later graduated from the College of the Holy Cross and the University of Michigan Law School, after which he became a practicing attorney and lobbyist. During World War II, he served in the United States Army. Hendee was a member of the Society of the Holy Name and the Knights of Columbus. Hendee served in the Wisconsin State Senate in 1957 and was a Republican. During his time in the state legislature, he was the youngest Republican in the state senate. In 1960, Hendee was a candidate for the United States House of Representatives from Wisconsin's 5th congressional district, losing to incumbent Henry S. Reuss. Hendee on March 11, 2016, in Madison, Wisconsin.

References

Politicians from Milwaukee
Republican Party Wisconsin state senators
Wisconsin lawyers
Military personnel from Milwaukee
United States Army soldiers
United States Army personnel of World War II
College of the Holy Cross alumni
University of Michigan Law School alumni
1923 births
2016 deaths
20th-century American lawyers
Shorewood High School (Wisconsin) alumni